Transcription initiation factor TFIID subunit 13 is a protein that in humans is encoded by the TAF13 gene.

Function 

Initiation of transcription by RNA polymerase II requires the activities of more than 70 polypeptides. The protein that coordinates these activities is transcription factor IID (TFIID), which binds to the core promoter to position the polymerase properly, serves as the scaffold for assembly of the remainder of the transcription complex, and acts as a channel for regulatory signals. TFIID is composed of the TATA-binding protein (TBP) and a group of evolutionarily conserved proteins known as TBP-associated factors or TAFs. TAFs may participate in basal transcription, serve as coactivators, function in promoter recognition or modify general transcription factors (GTFs) to facilitate complex assembly and transcription initiation. This gene encodes a small subunit associated with a subset of TFIID complexes. This subunit interacts with TBP and with two other small subunits of TFIID, TAF10 and TAF11. There is a pseudogene located on chromosome 6.

Interactions 

TAF13 has been shown to interact with TAF15, TAF11, TAF10 and TATA binding protein.

References

Further reading

External links